Highlander was launched at Sunderland in 1805 as a West Indiaman, trading with Demerara. She was captured in 1807 after a sanguinary single ship action. One of her passengers was a naval officer repatriating for illness, but who escaped French custody and later rose to be a Rear Admiral. She returned to British ownership and was wrecked in 1809.

Career
She first appeared in Lloyd's Register (LR) in 1806.

On 14 March 1807 while returning to England from Demerara, Highlander encountered the French privateer Alerte, Captain Moreau, of twenty-two 8-pounder guns and 150 men, which captured her. Highlander arrived at Guadeloupe on 30 March.

On the way he trained Highlanders crew in gunnery. When Alerte approached, he commanded Highlanders crew in her resistance to the privateer. Highlander was able to repel three attempts to board but had to strike after a fourth attempt succeeded. Highlander had suffered five men killed and seven wounded, including Westphal and her mate. Alerte sent Highlander into Guadeloupe.  

LR for 1808 carried the annotation "capt" beneath her name. The issue for 1809 had the same annotation, but also showed a change of owner, master, and trade, suggesting that somehow she had come back into British ownership.

Fate
Highlander, Cooper, master, from the Clyde, was lost at New Brunswick. The Register of Shipping (RS) for 1810 carried the annotation "LOST" by her name.

Notes

Citations

References
 

1800s ships
Age of Sail merchant ships of England
Captured ships
Maritime incidents in 1808